Fernando Bello (born 25 November 1957) is a Portuguese sailor. He competed in the Star event at the 1992 Summer Olympics.

References

External links
 

1957 births
Living people
Portuguese male sailors (sport)
Olympic sailors of Portugal
Sailors at the 1992 Summer Olympics – Star
Sportspeople from Lisbon